Muhammadan (born August 21, 1977 in Denpasar, Bali) is an Indonesian footballer that currently plays for Deltras FC in the Indonesia Super League.

Club statistics

References

External links

1977 births
Association football defenders
Living people
People from Denpasar
Sportspeople from Bali
Indonesian footballers
Liga 1 (Indonesia) players
Persiba Balikpapan players
Deltras F.C. players